The 1901–02 Brown men's ice hockey season was the 5th season of play for the program.

Season
Brown had a poor start to the season, losing its first four games, including one to a secondary school, before recovering at the end to win its final two contests. Brown didn't play a single game at home and its win over Columbia would be its last over a fellow college for 25 years.

Roster

Standings

Schedule and Results

|-
!colspan=12 style=";" | Regular Season

References

Brown Bears men's ice hockey seasons
Brown
Brown
Brown
Brown